Events from the year 2009 in Kuwait.

Incumbents
Emir: Sabah Al-Ahmad Al-Jaber Al-Sabah 
Prime Minister: Nasser Al-Sabah

Events

2009 Kuwait Emir Cup.

References

 
Kuwait
Kuwait
Years of the 21st century in Kuwait
2000s in Kuwait